The Chʼortiʼ people (alternatively, Chʼortiʼ Maya or Chorti) are one of the indigenous Maya peoples, who primarily reside in communities and towns of southeastern Guatemala, northwestern Honduras, and northern El Salvador. Their indigenous language, also known as Chʼortiʼ, is a survival of Classic Choltian, the language of the inscriptions in Copan. It is the first language of approximately 15,000 people, although the majority of present-day Chʼortiʼ speakers are bilingual in Spanish as well.

History 

The Chʼortiʼ area, which had Copán as its cultural center, was the headquarters of the ancient Mayan civilization.  The Chʼortiʼ people, led by the Mayan chief , strongly but unsuccessfully resisted the Spanish conquerors.

The Chʼortiʼ belong to the Meridional Mayans, and are closely related to the Mayans in Yucatán, Belize and Northern Guatemala.  They are also somewhat related to the Choles, Mayans who currently live in Chiapas.

Geographical location 

Historically, the Chʼorti Mayans were located in the Ocotepeque and Copan departments, as well as in the northern strip of the Cortes and Santa Barbara departments.  This geographical area possibly also extended to El Salvador on the south, to Chiquimula on the west, and to the Golfo Dulce to the north.  Currently, the majority of the Chʼorti are located in Guatemala (in Chiquimula, Jocotan, Esquipulas, Quezaltenango and La Union).

The current Guatemalan Chʼortiʼ population estimate is 46,833.

The Chʼortiʼ population in Honduras live in areas of difficult access in the Copan and Ocotepeque departments, like Chonco, Colon Jubuco, San Rafael, Tapescos, Carrizalon, La Laguna, Santa Rita, Antigua Ocotepeque, Nueva Ocotepeque, and Sensenti.

The current Honduran Chʼortiʼ population estimate is 4,200.  They are mostly farmers, and they lived in areas mixed with mestizos.

Organization and culture 

The Chʼortis in Copan speak Spanish; most Chʼorti speakers are in Guatemala.  This is because the political division between Honduras and Guatemala, and the inherent movement restriction between the two countries.

However, the traditional customs of dress have been kept, as well as musical traditions, expressed using instruments like teponangas, drums, whistles, chinchins, sonajas and horns.  The most traditional dance is called the "dance of the giants".

Their food is based mainly on corn and beans.  Corn is prepared in different ways: as a drink, like chilate, pozol, sweet atole, and sour atole (chuco), tortillas, tamales, totoposte and also alcoholic drinks like chicha.

Chʼorti' religion is based on admiring and adoring nature, through rituals dedicated to the gods of the Earth and the Wind.

Notes

Chiquimula Department
Copán Department
Indigenous peoples in El Salvador
Indigenous peoples in Guatemala
Indigenous peoples in Honduras
Indigenous peoples of Central America
Maya peoples
Mesoamerican cultures
Ocotepeque Department